Dame Georgina Manunui te Heuheu  (née Manunui, born 1943) is a New Zealand Māori politician. She was a Member of Parliament (MP) from the New Zealand National Party List, and a Cabinet Minister in the New Zealand Government.

Early life
Born Georgina Manunui in 1943, she is the daughter of George Manunui of Waitahanui. She is a member of the Ngāti Tuwharetoa tribe of the central North Island and is also related to Te Arawa and Tuhoe tribes. She was born and raised at Taurewa, near Mount Tongariro, and received her secondary schooling at Turakina Maori Girls' College (1956–59) and Auckland Girls' Grammar School (1960–61). She graduated from Victoria University of Wellington with a BA in English and an LLB, being the first Māori woman to gain a law degree and be admitted to the High Court as barrister and solicitor.

Professional life
Before being elected to Parliament, te Heuheu practised law in Wellington and Rotorua. She was a member of the Waitangi Tribunal (1986–96).

Member of Parliament

Georgina te Heuheu was first elected to Parliament in 1996.

She was the Minister for Courts and for Women's Affairs (1998–1999) during the Fourth National Party Government.

Speculation about her future arose in 2004 after she criticised then leader Don Brash's Orewa Speech. Questioned some weeks later, she refused to rule out the possibility that she might switch allegiance to the new Māori Party, which had formed after the resignation of Tariana Turia.

However she remained with National for the 2005 election and served as a backbencher for the party, serving as a Spokeswoman for Broadcasting, Associate Spokeswoman for Defence, Treaty of Waitangi Issues and Māori Affairs (Māori Development).

From 19 November 2008 until the 2011 election she was the Minister for Courts, Minister of Pacific Island Affairs, Minister of Disarmament and Arms Control, and Associate Minister of Māori Affairs in the National Party Government led by John Key. Te Heuheu announced she would retire at the 2011 election.

Life after Parliament
Te Heuheu was appointed chairwoman of Māori Television in 2012 and now also sits on several Māori Trust Boards and Charity Committees including the Tuwharetoa Māori Trust Board. In her capacity as chairwoman she has been leading a review of Māori Television services and its operational structure to see whether better outcomes can be achieved for the station.

Private life
She married Timoti ("Timi") te Heuheu, brother of Sir Tumu te Heuheu, a Ngāti Tuwharetoa leader and son of Sir Hepi Te Heuheu. He died in 2012. They had two sons.

Honours
In the 1993 Queen's Birthday Honours, te Heuheu was appointed a Companion of the Queen's Service Order for public services. In the 2018 New Year Honours, she was appointed a Dame Companion of the New Zealand Order of Merit, for services to the State and Māori.

See also
 First women lawyers around the world

References

External links
Profile at National party

1943 births
Living people
Members of the Cabinet of New Zealand
New Zealand National Party MPs
Victoria University of Wellington alumni
Women government ministers of New Zealand
Māori MPs
20th-century New Zealand lawyers
Dames Companion of the New Zealand Order of Merit
Companions of the Queen's Service Order
People educated at Auckland Girls' Grammar School
New Zealand list MPs
Ngāti Tūwharetoa people
Māori politicians
Members of the New Zealand House of Representatives
21st-century New Zealand politicians
21st-century New Zealand women politicians
Women members of the New Zealand House of Representatives
Members of the Waitangi Tribunal
Te Heuheu family
New Zealand Māori women lawyers